Cleveland is a town in the Cleveland Township of Rowan County, North Carolina, United States. The population was 871 at the 2010 census.

History
The town dates from 1831 but was not incorporated until 1833.  The first post office in Cleveland, Cowansville, was established in 1831.  By 1850, prior to the US Civil War and the completion of the Western Carolina Railroad, the town was named Rowan Mills.  Rowan Mills was named for the five story flour mill that Osborn Giles Foard owned in Cleveland.  The Rowan Mills Post Office served the area north of the rail line and extended into Scotch Irish Township after the Civil War in 1870.  The town and post office kept the name Rowan Mills until 1876 when it was renamed Third Creek Station.  In the 1880 U.S. Census, there were 17 families and 89 persons living in the Village of Third Creek Station.  It was not until 1884 that the townspeople renamed the town after Grover Cleveland, who is supposed to have visited the town during his presidential campaign.

Geography
Cleveland is located at  (35.731021, -80.678963).

Demographics

2020 census

As of the 2020 United States census, there were 846 people, 392 households, and 283 families residing in the town.

2010 census
As of the census of 2010, there were 871 people, 328 households, and 236 families residing in the town. The population density was 580.7 people per square mile (223.3/km2). There were 377 housing units at an average density of 251.3 per square mile (96.7/km2). The racial makeup of the town was 66.9% White, 24.1% African American, 5.4% from other races, and 3.6% from two or more races. Hispanic or Latino of any race were 6.5% of the population.

There were 328 households, out of which 34.1% had children under the age of 18 living with them, 47.6% were married couples living together, 16.5% had a female householder with no husband present, and 28.0% were non-families. 24.1% of all households were made up of individuals, and 9.4% had someone living alone who was 65 years of age or older. The average household size was 2.66 and the average family size was 3.10.

In the town, the population was spread out, with 28.4% under the age of 18, 7.2% from 18 to 24, 29.3% from 25 to 44, 23.4% from 45 to 64, and 11.7% who were 65 years of age or older. The median age was 34.8 years. For every 100 females, there were 95.3 males. For every 100 females age 18 and over, there were 90.2 males.

The median income for a household in the town was $39,474, and the median income for a family was $58,000. Males had a median income of $51,000 versus $29,500 for females. The per capita income for the town was $19,506. About 13.1% of families and 20.5% of the population were below the poverty line, including 25.0% of those under age 18 and 8.9% of those age 65 or over.

Town twinning / sister city
Since February 8, 2008, Cleveland has been twinned with Killyleagh, Northern Ireland.

See also
 Cleveland Township
 2007 Freightliner wildcat strike

References

External links
 Official site

Towns in North Carolina
Towns in Rowan County, North Carolina